Przewłoka may refer to the following villages in Poland:
Przewłoka, Parczew County in Lublin Voivodeship (east Poland)
Przewłoka, Tomaszów Lubelski County in Lublin Voivodeship (east Poland)
Przewłoka, Pomeranian Voivodeship (north Poland)
Przewłoka, Świętokrzyskie Voivodeship (south-central Poland)
Przewłoka, Podlaskie Voivodeship (north-east Poland)